Joshua J. Harris (born 1965) is an American businessman and investor. He co-founded Apollo Global Management in 1990, now one of the world's largest asset management firms. Harris is also the principal owner and managing partner of the Philadelphia 76ers of the National Basketball Association and the New Jersey Devils of the National Hockey League, as well as a shareholder of Crystal Palace F.C. of the English Premier League among other sporting ventures. His net worth was estimated to be 7.25 in 2023.

Early life and education
Harris was born to a Jewish family in 1965 and raised in Chevy Chase, Maryland. He attended high school in Washington D.C at The Field School. Harris graduated summa cum laude with a B.S. in economics from the Wharton School of the University of Pennsylvania in 1986, and then received his MBA from the Harvard Business School as a Baker Scholar and Loeb Finance Fellow. Harris wrestled in college.

Financial career
He began working in the mergers-and-acquisitions department at Drexel Burnham Lambert in 1986 and worked there for two years before leaving to get his MBA at Harvard. After graduating, he initially worked at Blackstone for two months before co-founding Apollo Global Management with Leon Black and Marc Rowan in 1990.

In 2008, Harris and his Apollo partners invested $2 billion into LyondellBasell before it filed for bankruptcy in 2009. When Apollo eventually sold their shares in the company in 2013, they realized a paper profit of $9.6 billion, the biggest profit ever from a private equity investment according to Bloomberg.

He is currently one of three managing partners of Apollo, along with Black and Rowan. Harris' role includes oversight of the firm's day-to-day operations. 

In 2017, Harris met with Trump officials to discuss infrastructure issues. In November of that year, Apollo Global Management loaned $184 million to Kushner Companies.  Apollo spokesman Charles V. Zehren stated that Harris was not involved in the decision to loan to Kushner.

As of the end of the third quarter of 2020, Harris and his Apollo partners reported that the firm had $433 billion in assets under management.

Sports

Philadelphia 76ers 
In 2011, Harris and David S. Blitzer of the private equity firm Blackstone Group led an investment group that purchased the Philadelphia 76ers of the National Basketball Association (NBA) from Comcast Spectacor for 280 million. Other notable members of the investment group were Art Wrubel, Jason Levien, Adam Aron, Martin J. Geller, David B. Heller, James Lassiter, Marc J. Leder, Michael G. Rubin, Will Smith, Jada Pinkett Smith, and Erick Thohir.

New Jersey Devils 
On August 15, 2013, it was announced that HBSE, led by Harris and partner Blitzer purchased a majority stake in the New Jersey Devils of the NHL, which includes the rights to operate Prudential Center in Newark, New Jersey. The transaction was reportedly for over $320 million.

Crystal Palace F.C. 
Harris and Blitzer each bought an 18% stake in Crystal Palace FC in December 2015, matching the stake owned by team chairman Steve Parish and giving the three control of the club.

Other sporting ventures 
Harris and Blitzer, through Harris Blitzer Sports and Entertainment, also own the NBA G League's Delaware Blue Coats, the AHL's Utica Comets, esports team Dignitas of New Meta Entertainment, sports tech venture capital firm HBSE Ventures, and marketing, hospitality, and event ticketing company Elevate Sports Ventures.

In June 2020, Harris & Blitzer personally acquired a stake of less than 5% in the NFL's Pittsburgh Steelers. As part of this transaction, the two joined the ownership group as passive investors.

Personal life
Harris is married to Marjorie Harris (née Rubin), they have five children, and live in Miami. In 2020, the family moved to Miami, Florida from New York City. Harris sits on the board of Mount Sinai Medical Center,  Harvard Business School,  and Wharton’s Board of Overseers.  In 2013, he was honored by the National Wrestling Hall of Fame with the Outstanding American Award. Harris regularly supports the teams he is involved with by attending games and he trains for and runs in marathons.

Philanthropy 
Harris and his wife Marjorie co-founded Harris Family Charitable Foundation, now known as Harris Philanthropies, in 2014. In 2015, Harris committed to donate $3.5 million over a span of five years to the Philadelphia Police Athletic League.

In February 2019, Harris and his wife donated $10 million to his alma mater, the Wharton School of the University of Pennsylvania, to establish the Joshua J. Harris Alternative Investments Program. Previously, Harris established the school’s Harris Family Endowed Scholarship. In July 2018, the foundation also donated a million to support University of Pennsylvania's wrestling program. In August 2020, Harris and his wife donated a $2 million to the Bridgespan Group to launch Leading for Impact, a leadership program to serve Philadelphia area nonprofits.

References

External links
 
 

1965 births
Living people
American billionaires
American financiers
20th-century American Jews
Apollo Global Management people
Drexel Burnham Lambert
Harvard Business School alumni
Jewish American sportspeople
National Hockey League owners
New Jersey Devils executives
New York (state) Republicans
Philadelphia 76ers owners
Wharton School of the University of Pennsylvania alumni
21st-century American Jews
Chairmen and investors of football clubs in England
American soccer chairmen and investors